The Fujifilm GFX 50S is a mirrorless medium format camera produced by Fujifilm. It was the first camera featuring the Fujifilm G-mount. The camera was announced by Fujifilm during the photokina 2016 exhibition in Cologne, Germany, and production began at the start of 2017.The camera was available for sale from February 28, 2017.

It is the second mirrorless medium format camera ever produced and the first one with the shutter attached to the body and not to the attached lenses (focal plane shutter).

The camera's 43.8x32.9 mm2 sensor is 1.7x larger in area than that of 35 mm, built by Sony and customised by Fujifilm. The crop factor compared to the 35 mm format as a reference is 0.79. The camera's lens mount is the Fujifilm G-mount.
GFX 50S jointly won a Camera Grand Prix Japan 2017 Editors Award.

The GFX50S II and the GFX 50R succeeds the GFX 50S. The GFX50S II was announced on September 2, 2021 and the GFX 50R was announced on January 23, 2019.

See also 
 Fujifilm GFX100
 Fujifilm G-mount

References

External links 

 Fujifilm GFX 50S official site

Fujifilm G-mount cameras
Cameras introduced in 2017